Albright is a surname. Notable people with the surname include:

Adam Emory Albright (1862–1957), American artist, father of Ivan Albright
Alan Albright (born 1959), American judge
Alex Albright (born 1988), American football player
Arthur Albright (1811–1900), British chemist, co-founder of Albright & Wilson
Betty Nippi-Albright, Canadian politician
Bill Albright (1929–2013), American player of Canadian football
Brent Albright (born 1978), American professional wrestler
Bryson Albright (1994–2019), American football player
Budd Albright (born 1936), American actor, singer, stuntman, and sportsman
Carol Bonomo Albright, American writer and editor
Charles Albright (1830–1880), American politician
Charles Albright (born 1933), American serial killer
Charles J. Albright (1816–1883), American politician
Charlie Albright, American classical pianist
Chris Albright (born 1979), American soccer player
Claude Albright (1873–1923), American opera singer
Clint Albright (1926–1999), Canadian ice hockey player
Daniel Albright (1945–2015), American literary critic, musicologist, poet
Dave Albright (born 1960), American football player
David Albright, American scientist
Edward Albright (1873–1937), American politician
Ethan Albright (born 1971), American football player
Frank Herman Albright (1865–1940), American Army General
Fuller Albright (1900–1969), American endocrinologist
Gary Albright (1963–2000), American wrestler, known by the stagename Vokhan Singh
George Albright (born 1959), American politician
George W. Albright (1846–19??), American farmer, educator, and politician
Gerald Albright (born 1957), American jazz saxophonist, keyboardist, and bass guitarist
Gertrude Partington Albright (1874–1959), British-born American artist
Hardie Albright (1903–1975), American actor
Harrison Albright (1866–1932), American architect
Harry Albright, American editor
Horace Marden Albright (1890–1987), American conservationist
Ira Albright (1959–2020), American football player
Ivan Le Lorraine Albright (1897–1983), painter and artist, son of Adam Albright
Jack Albright (1921–1991), American baseball player
Jacob Albright (1759–1808), American Christian leader and founder of the Evangelical Association
Jane Albright (born 1955), American basketball player and coach
John Albright (died 1609), Anglican priest
John J. Albright (1848–1931), American businessman and philanthropist
Joseph Albright (journalist) (born 1937), American journalist, former husband of Madeleine Albright
Joseph Albright (1938–2009), American jurist and Justice of the West Virginia Supreme Court of Appeals
Kelly Albright (born 1987), American politician
Lola Albright (1924–2017), American singer and actress.
Madeleine Albright (1937–2022), U.S. Secretary of State during the Clinton Administration
Matthew Albright (born 1991), Canadian football player
Nat Allbright (1923–2011), American sports announcer
Nina Albright (1907–1997), American comic book artist
Parney Albright, American physicist and weapons scientist
Ray Albright (1934–2017), American businessman and politician
Susan Albright, American journalist
Tenley Albright (born 1935), American female skater and Olympian
Thomas Albright (1909–1986), American baseball player
Tony Albright (born 1962), American politician
Wally Albright (1925–1999), American child actor
Will Albright (1919–1987), American racing driver
William Albright (musician) (1944–1998), composer, pianist and organist
William Donald Albright (1881–1946), Canadian agriculturalist and journalist
William F. Albright (1891–1971), biblical archaeologist

Fictional characters:
Alan Albright, character on Ben 10: Alien Force
Dorothy Albright, character from the video game series Arcana Heart
Margie Albright, played by Gale Storm on "My Little Margie"
Dr. Mary Albright, played by Jane Curtin on 3rd Rock from the Sun
Sally Albright, played by Meg Ryan in When Harry Met Sally...

Julie Albright, main title character of the Julie Albright books in the American Girls collection.
Allen Albright, supporting character in Ben 10: Alien Force, Ben 10: Ultimate Alien and Ben 10: Omniverse''